is a former Japanese football player.

Playing career
Kuno was born in Shizuoka on September 25, 1973. After graduating from Tokyo University of Agriculture, he joined Japan Football League club Fujitsu (later Kawasaki Frontale) in 1996. He became a regular player as left side midfielder from 1998 and the club was promoted to new league J2 League from 1999. In 1999, the club won the champions and was promoted to J1 League from 2000. In 2000, the club won the 2nd place J.League Cup. However the club results were bad in league competition and was relegated to J2 in a year. From 2002, his opportunity to play as left side midfielder decreased and played many matches as defensive midfielder. In 2004, he played as regula defensive midfielder and the club won the champions and was promoted to J1 from 2005. However his opportunity to play decreased in 2005 and he retired end of 2005 season.

Club statistics

References

External links

1973 births
Living people
Tokyo University of Agriculture alumni
Association football people from Shizuoka Prefecture
Japanese footballers
J1 League players
J2 League players
Japan Football League (1992–1998) players
Kawasaki Frontale players
Association football midfielders